Solli may refer to:

Solli (surname)
Solli plass, a square in Oslo, Norway
Solli tram stop, an Oslo Tramway station
FC Solli Plyus Kharkiv, an amateur football club from Kharkiv, Ukraine